Ready or Not is the debut solo studio album by American rock singer-songwriter Lou Gramm, released in February 1987 by Atlantic Records.

Production
Eight of the ten songs, which comprise Ready Or Not, were written by Gramm in partnership with former Black Sheep bandmate Bruce Turgon. The album was recorded in 1986 at Bear Tracks Recording in Suffern, New York and The Hit Factory Recording in New York City. It was produced by Gramm and Pat Moran, who is known as an engineer on recordings by such performers as Rush and Robert Plant.

Reception
Ready Or Not was a commercial success, reaching number 27 on the US Billboard 200. It generated two hit songs. The lead-off single, "Midnight Blue", peaked at number 5 on the Billboard Hot 100 and climbed to the top of the Mainstream Rock chart. It has been Gramm's only song to have charted in the United Kingdom. The second single from the album was the title song, which reached number 54 on the Billboard 200 and number 7 on the Mainstream Rock charts.

The album has enjoyed critical acclaim. Bret Adams has given Ready or Not a retrospective rating of four-and-a-half stars out of five on AllMusic. He has described it as "rich with melody and snap".

Track listing

Personnel 
 Lou Gramm – vocals, percussion
 Philip Ashley – keyboards, programming
 Bruce Turgon – keyboards, rhythm guitars, bass, lead guitar (on "Lover Come Back")
 Nils Lofgren – lead guitar
 Ben Gramm – drums

Additional musicians 
 Richard Grammatico – lead guitar (on "If I Don't Have You"), additional guitar (on "Time")
 Don Mancuso – additional guitar (on "Chain of Love")
 Eddie Martinez – additional guitar (on "Ready or Not", "Midnight Blue" and "Chain of Love")
 Stanley Sheldon – bass (on "Midnight Blue" and "If I Don't Have You")
 Mark Rivera – soprano saxophone (on "Lover Come Back"), tenor saxophone, backing vocals
 Crispin Cioe – baritone saxophone, tenor saxophone 
 Ben Grammatico Sr. – lead trumpet
 Ben Grammatico Jr. – trumpet
 Sherryl Marshall – backing vocals
 Cookie Watkins – backing vocals

Production 
 Lou Gramm – producer 
 Pat Moran – producer, engineer
 Ted Jensen – mastering at Sterling Sound (New York, NY).
 Timothy White – cover photography
 Bob Defrin – art direction, design

Charts

Weekly charts

Year-end charts

References

Lou Gramm albums
1987 debut albums
Atlantic Records albums
Albums produced by Pat Moran